Lucio De Caro (born 15 January 1922) is an Italian retired screenwriter and film director. He also worked as a journalist.

Selected filmography
 Tragic Night (1942)
 The Twentieth Duke (1945)
 Processo per direttissima (1974)
 Flatfoot in Hong Kong (1975)
 Piange... il telefono (1975)
 Speed Cross (1980)

References

Bibliography
 Peter Bondanella. The Films of Federico Fellini. Cambridge University Press, 2002.

External links

1922 births
Possibly living people
Italian screenwriters
Italian film directors
People from Pescara
Italian male screenwriters